Devika Sumitra Kathrina Vidot (born in Takamaka in November 1988) is a Seychellois accountant and politician. Since 3 November 2020, she serves as Minister of Investment, Entrepreneurship and Industry.

Biography
Vidot graduated with a degree in accounting and finance from the University of Manchester and a master's degree in professional accountancy. She has worked in the financial service industry and is experienced in auditing. She has also been a lecturer at the University of Seychelles in business administration. Her last occupation was for the offshore industry.

On 31 October 2020, Vidot was elected unanimously as Minister of Investment, Entrepreneurship and Industry.

References

1988 births
Living people
Government ministers of Seychelles
Women government ministers of Seychelles
Alumni of the University of Manchester
Seychellois accountants
People from Takamaka, Seychelles
Seychellois people of Indian descent
Seychellois Hindus